Betteridge is a surname. Notable people with the surname include:

 Alice Betteridge (1901–1966), Australian deafblind woman
 Kelly Betteridge (born 1969) British Anglican priest
 Lois Betteridge (1928–2020), Canadian silversmith, goldsmith, designer and educator
 Lois Betteridge (canoeist) (born 1997), Canadian slalom canoeist 
 Maurice Betteridge (1927–2020), Australian historian
 Mick Betteridge (1924–1999), British footballer 
 Ollie Betteridge (born 1996), British ice hockey player

See also
 Betteridge's law of headlines